Nevelske is a settlement in Yasynuvata Raion (district) in Donetsk Oblast of eastern Ukraine, at about 25 km WNW from the centre of Donetsk city.

The War in Donbass, that started in mid-April 2014, has brought along both civilian and military casualties. Two Ukrainian servicemen were killed and two others were wounded in action at Nevelske on 8 November 2014. Two Ukrainian soldiers were wounded at Nevelske on 16 December 2016. On 14 November 2021 nine houses were damaged due to the shelling of Nevelske. Three days latter seven houses were damaged, destroying two of them.

References

External links
 Weather forecast for Nevelske

Villages in Pokrovsk Raion